Geijer is a Swedish surname. People with this surname include:

Agnes Geijer (1898–1989), Swedish historian and archaeologist
Arne Geijer (1910–1979), trade unionist
Erik Gustaf Geijer (1783–1847), writer, composer, and historian
Eric Neville Geijer (1894–1941), herald and genealogist
Lennart Geijer (1909–1999), Minister for Justice
Mona Geijer-Falkner (1887–1973), film actress
Reinhold Geijer (born 1953), banker
Geijer family, Swedish noble family of Austrian origin

See also
C. Geijer & Co, Norwegian company founded in 1869 and sold in 1989
Gayer (surname)
Geier (disambiguation)
Geyer (disambiguation)

Swedish-language surnames